Shahr Dar-e Bala (also Romanized as Shahr Dar-e Bālā; also known as Shahr Dar and Shahr-i-dār) is a village in Zarabad-e Gharbi Rural District, Zarabad District, Konarak County, Sistan and Baluchestan Province, Iran. At the 2006 census, its population was 437, in 82 families.

References 

Populated places in Konarak County